The 1920 Kansas Jayhawks football team represented the University of Kansas in the Missouri Valley Conference during the 1920 college football season. It was the first and only season under head coach Phog Allen, who is more well known for his accomplishments with the Jayhawks men's basketball team. The Jayhawks compiled a 5–2–1 record (3–2 against conference opponents), tied for third place in the conference. They outscored opponents by a combined total of 117 to 60. They played their home games at McCook Field in Lawrence, Kansas, which was their final season at the venue. George Nettels was the team captain.

Schedule

References

Kansas
Kansas Jayhawks football seasons
Kansas Jayhawks football